The Bowes Morrell House is a historic building on Walmgate in the city centre of York, in England.

The house was one of four for which a licence was granted in 1396 to construct in the churchyard of St Peter-le-Willows.  It may have been used as a vicarage for the church, or alternatively for St Margaret's Church.  In later years, the building was a cheap lodging house for travelling workers.  By the late 19th-century, it was owned by the O'Hara family, bought out by the Kilmartin family in the 1930s.  It was nicknamed the "doss house", and had a sign above the door reading "good lodgings down this passage", despite its reputation for poor-quality accommodation.

The house is timber framed, with two stories, and originally had an L plan, with the main section being a hall 20 feet long and 10-and-a-half feet wide.  An extension was built in the 16th century, giving the building a square plan.  In the late-17th century, a further extension was added in brick to the south end of the original building, while the current second floor over the hall dates from the 18th century.  The crown post roof survives, as does much of its timber framing, although some has been renewed.

The house was partially restored in 1932.  In 1954, it was Grade II* listed, and in 1966, it was bought and more thoroughly restored by the York Civic Trust.  It renamed the building after John Bowes Morrell, one of its founders.  It was later occupied by the Council for British Archaeology.  In 2004, it was purchased by the York Conservation Trust, and from 2012 it was occupied by the Cyrenians drug and alcohol rehabilitation charity.

References

Grade II* listed buildings in York
Houses completed in 1396
Houses in North Yorkshire
Timber framed buildings in Yorkshire
Walmgate